Clarion Hotel and Casino, formerly known as Debbie Reynolds' Hollywood Hotel and Greek Isles Hotel & Casino, was near the Las Vegas Strip in Paradise, Nevada. The hotel originally opened in 1970 as a Royal Inn, and also operated under the names Royal Americana Hotel and The Paddlewheel Hotel Casino before being purchased by Debbie Reynolds in 1992. After Reynolds sold the property in 1999, it was briefly owned by the World Wrestling Federation, and was then sold and remodeled as the Greek Isles.

The hotel closed on September 2, 2014, after Labor Day weekend.

The Clarion Hotel and Casino was demolished by implosion shortly before 3 a.m. on February 10, 2015.

History

Royal Inn (1970–80)
Royal Inns of America opened its $3 million, 200-room hotel in 1970. In 1972, Michael Gaughan and Frank Toti bought out the property's casino operations.

In 1979, fast food operator (and former automat chain) Horn & Hardart agreed to buy the Royal Inn for $7.4 million.

Royal Americana Hotel (1980–82)
By late 1980, the sale had been completed, and the property was rebranded as the Royal Americana Hotel, with a New York theme. A $3.5 million renovation increased the room count to 300. By 1982 though, the hotel was experiencing substantial losses, and Horn & Hardart decided to close it. They reportedly agreed that December to sell the property to an investment group for $15.4 million.

The Paddlewheel Hotel Casino (1983–93)
The property later reopened as the Paddlewheel Hotel & Casino. It had a kid-friendly atmosphere, with arcade games and amusement rides, but later shifted to an adult focus, including a male revue. Horn & Hardart put the hotel back up for sale in 1990.

It did not sell until 1992, when actress Debbie Reynolds and her husband Richard Hamlett bought the closed Paddlewheel at auction for $2.2 million. Reynolds planned to spend $15 million on renovations, including adding a museum to house her collection of Hollywood memorabilia, and a 500-seat theater where she would perform.

Debbie Reynolds' Hollywood Hotel (1993–99)
The property reopened in 1993, with the casino operated by Jackpot Enterprises, but Reynolds struggled with the financing to complete the project. She took the company public in 1994 to raise money, and the museum finally opened the following year. The casino closed in 1996 after Jackpot pulled out because it was unprofitable, and Reynolds could not get a gaming license to operate it in-house because of the company's poor finances. After a deal to sell the property to timeshare developer ILX Inc. for $16.8 million fell through, Reynolds and the hotel both filed for bankruptcy protection in 1997, and the property was put up for auction the following year.

The winning bidder at $10.65 million was the World Wrestling Federation, which planned to level the building and construct a 35-story wrestling-themed hotel and casino. They stripped much of the interior in preparation for demolition, but ultimately decided the site was not big enough. The hotel was open for a short time (including October 2000) as "Convention Center Drive Hotel." They sold it to Chicago-based Mark IV Realty Group in 2000 for $11.2 million.

Greek Isles Hotel & Casino (2001–09)
Mark IV hoped to redevelop the site with 1,000 rooms, but instead remodeled the property with a Greek theme and reopened it as the Greek Isles in 2001. The Greek Isles contracted with Delta Air Lines to house flight crews during layovers.

The developer never came through, and the hotel tried expanding operations.

Clarion Hotel and Casino (2009 – September 2014)
The hotel was forced into bankruptcy on April 6, 2009, by its creditors. Canpartners Reality (owned by Canyon Capital Reality Partners and Spectrum Group Management) took over control on August 19, 2009, taking possession of the foreclosed property. As of April 2013, the hotel was branded a Clarion Hotel, the only Clarion with a casino. The 300-seat theater built by Debbie Reynolds was used for a Sunday Gospel Brunch and a nightly show.

The hotel closed on September 2, 2014, after the Labor Day weekend. Its contents and inventory were put up for sale.

In October 2014, developer Lorenzo Doumani purchased the property for $22.5 Million.

Demolition
The Clarion was demolished by implosion shortly before 3 a.m. on February 10, 2015. Lorenzo Douman's plan is to build a 720 suite five star non-gaming hotel with six restaurants, 270,000 square feet of Corporate Sky Suites, and an all encompassing medical wellness spa and fitness facility on the site to begin construction in September 2020. As of December 2022, the site remains undeveloped, however.

See also

References

1970 establishments in Nevada
2014 disestablishments in Nevada
Buildings and structures demolished in 2015
Hotels in Paradise, Nevada
Defunct casinos in the Las Vegas Valley
Demolished hotels in Clark County, Nevada
Buildings and structures demolished by controlled implosion
Defunct hotels in the Las Vegas Valley
Hotels established in 1970
Hotel buildings completed in 1970
Casino hotels